The Minnesota Air National Guard Museum is an aviation museum located at Minneapolis–Saint Paul Joint Air Reserve Station in Fort Snelling, Minnesota. It is dedicated to the history of the Minnesota Air National Guard.

History 
Founded by the 133rd Tactical Air Guard Historical Foundation in four former F-89 hangars and a two-story building, the museum was officially dedicated on 22 July 1984. However, it only opened to the public in April 1987.

Following the September 11th attacks, the museum was forced to disassemble its main exhibit gallery and place it in storage. The hangars were used to host F-16s from the 179th Fighter Squadron for five months. After they vacated the building, the museum reopened in 2004.

A significant dispute arose in 2007 over the transfer of a Lockheed A-12 from the museum to the George Bush Center for Intelligence in Langley, Virginia. The museum had recovered the aircraft from California in 1990, but it was on loan from the National Museum of the United States Air Force. To satisfy the CIA's request, the latter argued that the former did not meet the requirements for museums in its loan program and it was the only available example that did not have a significant connection to its community. The Minnesota Air National Guard Museum countered that A-12s at other museums were better candidates for the transfer. Nevertheless, the aircraft was eventually moved to CIA headquarters.

A Bell AH-1S Cobra at the museum was transferred to the U.S. Army Field Artillery Museum at Fort Sill, Oklahoma in March 2019.

Collection 

 Beechcraft C-45 Expeditor
 Bell UH-1H Iroquois
 Boeing C-97G Stratofreighter
 Convair C-131H Samaritan
 Convair F-102 Delta Dagger
 Curtiss JN-4H – replica
 Curtiss Oriole – replica
 Douglas C-47 Skytrain
 General Dynamics F-16A Fighting Falcon
 Lockheed C-130A Hercules
 Lockheed F-94C Starfire
 Lockheed T-33A
 McDonnell F-4C Phantom II
 McDonnell F-101B Voodoo
 McDonnell RF-4C Phantom II
 Mikoyan-Gurevich MiG-15
 North American AT-6 Texan
 North American F-51 Mustang
 North American T-28 Trojan
 Northrop F-89H Scorpion
 Piper L-4 Grasshopper

See also 
 South Dakota Air and Space Museum
 List of aviation museums

References

Footnotes

Notes

External links 

 

1984 establishments in Minnesota
Aerospace museums in Minnesota
Museums in Hennepin County, Minnesota
Museums established in 1984
National Guard (United States) museums